Ryan Hale (born July 10, 1975) is a former American football defensive tackle who played two seasons with the New York Giants of the National Football League (NFL). He was drafted by the New York Giants in the seventh round of the 1999 NFL Draft. He played college football at the University of Arkansas and attended Rogers High School in Rogers, Arkansas.

Professional career

New York Giants
Hale was selected by the New York Giants with the 225th pick in the 1999 NFL Draft. He played in 25 games for the Giants from 1999 to 2000. He was released by the Giants on September 2, 2001.

References

External links
Just Sports Stats
NFL Draft Scout

Living people
1975 births
Players of American football from Arkansas
American football defensive tackles
Rogers High School (Arkansas) alumni
Arkansas Razorbacks football players
New York Giants players
Sportspeople from Rogers, Arkansas